Aleksandr Georgievich Baryshnikov (born November 11, 1948) is a former Soviet athlete who competed mainly in the Shot Put. He trained at Dynamo in Leningrad.

He competed for the USSR in the 1976 Summer Olympics held in Montreal, Quebec, Canada in the Shot Put where he won the bronze medal. He returned four years later in the 1980 Summer Olympics held in Moscow, Soviet Union where he improved one place to second winning the silver medal.

He was awarded the Order of the Badge of Honor.

External links
  Biography

1948 births
Living people
Soviet male shot putters
Olympic bronze medalists for the Soviet Union
Olympic silver medalists for the Soviet Union
Athletes (track and field) at the 1972 Summer Olympics
Athletes (track and field) at the 1976 Summer Olympics
Athletes (track and field) at the 1980 Summer Olympics
Olympic athletes of the Soviet Union
Place of birth missing (living people)
Dynamo sports society athletes
World record setters in athletics (track and field)
European Athletics Championships medalists
Medalists at the 1980 Summer Olympics
Medalists at the 1976 Summer Olympics
Olympic silver medalists in athletics (track and field)
Olympic bronze medalists in athletics (track and field)
Universiade medalists in athletics (track and field)
Universiade bronze medalists for the Soviet Union
Medalists at the 1973 Summer Universiade